Fatou Baldeh MBE (born December 1983) is a Gambian FGM survivor and women's rights activist who campaigns to end female genital mutilation (FGM).

Biography 
She underwent female genital mutilation at the age of seven and became a victim of mutilation similar to her mother.

Career 
She completed a bachelor's degree in Psychology and Health at the University of Wolverhampton and completed her master's degree in sexual and reproductive health at the Queen Margaret University near Edinburgh.

After completing her studies, she worked for the Dignity Alert Research Forum in Edinburgh working to strengthen the women's rights and human rights. In May 2015, she was appointed as the director of the Dignity Alert Research Forum. In 2013, she publicly pointed out the issues of female genital mutilation of girls in Scotland and she was heavily criticised for such statements. On 30 January 2014, she subsequently appeared before the Equal Opportunities Committee at the Scottish Parliament where she was asked to engage in an individual presentation to explain the about the measures and guidelines required to be implemented in order to prevent young women from being victims of FGM in Scotland.

After spending most of her life as an activist in Scotland, she returned to The Gambia in 2018. She founded the Women in Liberation and Leadership (WILL) organisation after returning to Gambia. She has also conducted workshops and seminars in Gambia and also at the International Center for Transitional Justice.

In March 2020, she received She Award for her outstanding contribution in empowering girls and women in Gambia. In January 2020, she was given the Order of the British Empire by the British Ambassador to the Gambia Sharon Wardle as a result the 2019 Special Honours in recognition of her valuable efforts and commitments regarding advocating black minority and ethnic communities in Scotland.

References 

1983 births
Living people
Gambian feminists
Gambian women's rights activists
Gambian women activists
Alumni of Queen Margaret University